Aqdarreh-ye Olya (also Romanized as Āqdarreh-ye ‘Olyā; also known as Āgh Darreh-ye ‘Olyā) is a village in Ahmadabad Rural District, Takht-e Soleyman District, Takab County, West Azerbaijan Province, Iran. At the 2006 census, its population was 629, in 119 families.

References 

Populated places in Takab County